The University of Los Lagos is a university in Chile. It is a derivative university part of the Chilean Traditional Universities. It currently operates various campuses: the main campus in Osorno, and others in Ancud, Castro and Puerto Montt.

External links

 Official Site

Universities in Chile
Universities in Los Ríos Region
Universities in Los Lagos Region